Olive is a print magazine launched in 2003 and is a premium, monthly British food magazine featuring triple-tested recipes, restaurant recommendations, and food-focused travel. Its website, olivemagazine.com, launched in 2015, and it's also available to read via the olive magazine app, Apple News and Apple News+.

Laura Rowe became olive magazine's editor in 2015 (she was named FIPP's Rising Star in 2017 and won BSME's Food & Drink Editor of the Year 2018). Orlando Murrin was founder editor, and Christine Hayes edited the title until 2015.

Edd Kimber, John Gregory-Smith and Sabrina Ghayour are regular recipe contributors, with Mark Taylor, Clare Hargreaves, Suzy Bennett and Lucy Gillmore writing monthly restaurant and travel features. Kate Hawkings is the wine columnist.

olive is known for its Supermarket Awards, where the team blind-taste the best seasonal products from the supermarkets at Easter, summer and Christmas, and launched its Supermarket Wine Awards in 2019. The olive Chef Awards were launched in 2018, heralding unsung chefs across the UK.

The weekly olive magazine podcast, which launched in 2016, features the team chatting to (and sometimes cooking with) foodies across the country including chefs, producers, food writers and travel experts. This is available to listen to on olivemagazine.com and on Acast, iTunes, Spotify and the top podcast providers.

olive has won several awards including Food & Drink Magazine of the Year at Digital Magazine Awards 2014, Best City Break Feature at French Travel Media Awards 2016 and Consumer Magazine Section of the Year at the 2017 Travel Media Awards.

References

External links
 
  Olive magazine launches alternative restaurant awards
 Times online (login required)

Monthly magazines published in the United Kingdom
BBC publications
Food and drink magazines
Magazines established in 2003